Asheton Hogan, also known as Pluss and A+, is an American songwriter and producer, best known for his production and songwriting work with Lil Wayne ("Love Me"), Beyoncé ("Formation"), and Kendrick Lamar ("Humble"), amassing 1 Grammy win from 5 nominations.

Growing up in Atlanta, Georgia through his high-school years, Hogan showed an early interest in music production, and formally entered the music industry at the behest of childhood friend Mike Will Made It, who had himself begun writing and producing for local artists. His first professional music placements included Lil Wayne's hit single "Love Me" featuring Future/Drake, and Future's "Truth Gonna Hurt You". Hogan has continued to work with other acts, including Nicki Minaj, Chloe x Halle, Rae Sremmurd, Lecrae, and Ty Dolla Sign among many others, and is currently an in-house producer with Mike Will Made It's EarDrummers recording label.

Songwriting and production credits
Credits are courtesy of Discogs, Tidal, Apple Music, and AllMusic.

Awards and nominations

References 

Living people
African-American songwriters
African-American record producers
American hip hop record producers
Year of birth missing (living people)
People from Canton, Ohio